Poolangal  is a village in the Virudhunagar district in the Indian state of Tamil Nadu. .

Schools
Panchayat Union Primary School 
Government Higher secondary School

Transport

Bus route A34 connects Poolangal to the town of Aruppukottai.

References

Villages in Virudhunagar district